Fabrice Burgaud (born October 23 1971), is a French magistrate, best known for presiding over the Outreau trial in 2004. On February 8, 2006, Burgaud appeared before the members of the French Parliament in a review of his actions as magistrate during that trial.

The event was covered by several French television channels (including TF1, France 2 and La Chaîne Parlementaire) and was also reported by various radio stations. Burgaud was quoted as saying : “Today, maybe more than any other, I can feel the pain [of the acquitted men, of whom some were present during the audition], imagine what they have experienced, their imprisonment, the separation from their loved ones, their integrity put into question…  I take full responsibility for the investigation and I do not wish to hide from any of that responsibility”.

He told the parliamentary inquiry that he “was honest and entirely unprejudiced in his judgement.” He cited as evidence the disturbing nature of the children's testimonies, which referred to details of terrible abuse.

Bibliography
 Patrick Maisonneuve (2015), Justice et politique : le couple infernal (in French), Plon
 Florence Aubenas (2005), La Méprise : l'affaire d'Outreau (in French), Paris, éditions du Seuil, "H. C. Essais"
 Father Dominique Wiel (2006), Que Dieu ait pitié de nous (in French), Paris, Oh! éditions
 Marie-Christine Gryson-Dejehansart (2009), Outreau : la vérité abusée, 12 enfants reconnus victimes (in French), Paris, Hugo & Co.
 Jacques Thomet (2013), Retour à Outreau, Kontre-Kulture

Filmography
 Rémi Lainé (2011), Outreau, notre histoire (in French), documentary
 Vincent Garenq (2011), Guilty
 Serge Garde (2013), Outreau, l'autre vérité (in French), documentary

See also
Outreau trial

References 

1971 births
Living people
French magistrates
21st-century French judges
Court of Cassation (France) judges
Overturned convictions in France
University of Bordeaux alumni